K-1 PREMIUM 2006 Dynamite!! was an annual kickboxing and mixed martial arts event held by K-1 and Hero's on New Year's Eve, Sunday, December 31, 2006 at the Kyocera Dome Osaka in Osaka, Japan. It featured 10 HERO'S MMA rules fights, and 4 K-1 rules fights.

The event attracted a sellout crowd of 51,930 to the Kyocera Dome Osaka, and was broadcast live across Japan on the TBS Network.

The main event between Kazushi Sakuraba and Yoshihiro Akiyama was ruled to be a No Contest after it was determined that Akiyama had applied an illegal substance.

Dynamite!! 2006 was also the final time Genki Sudo stepped into the ring as after his match, Sudo shocked the crowd by announcing his retirement.

Results

Opening Fight #1, HERO'S MMA Rules:
  Dong-wook Kim vs.  Yukiya Naito
Naito defeated Kim by TKO (Punches) at 1:11 of the 1st round.

Opening Fight #2, HERO'S MMA Rules:
  Ken Kaneko vs.  Andy Ologun
Ologun defeated Kaneko by Unanimous Decision (3–0).

Fight #1, HERO'S MMA Rules:
  Katsuhiko Nagata vs.  Shuichiro Katsumura
Nagat defeated Katsumura by TKO (Punches) at 4:12 of the 1st round.

Fight #2, HERO'S MMA Rules:
  Tokimitsu Ishizawa vs.  Taiei Kin
Kin defeated Ishizawa by KO (Head Kick) at 2:48 of the 1st round.

Fight #3, HERO'S MMA Rules:
  Hideo Tokoro vs.  Royler Gracie
Tokoro defeated Gracie by Unanimous Decision (3–0)

Fight #4, HERO'S MMA Rules:
  Akebono vs.  Giant Silva
Silva defeated Akebono by Submission (Kimura Lock) at 1:02 of the 1st round.

Fight #5, K-1 Rules:
  Badr Hari vs.  Nicholas Pettas
Hari defeated Pettas by TKO (Injury) at 1:28 of the 2nd round.

Fight #6, K-1 Rules:
  Musashi vs.  Randy Kim
Musashi defeated Kim by KO at 0:33 of the 3rd round.

Fight #7, K-1 Rules:
  Semmy Schilt vs.  Peter Graham
Schilt defeated Graham by 5 round Unanimous decision (3–0)

Fight #8, HERO'S MMA Rules:
  Genki Sudo vs.  Damacio Page
Sudo defeated Page by Submission (Triangle Choke) at 3:05 of the 1st round.

Fight #9, HERO'S MMA Rules:
  Norifumi "KID" Yamamoto vs.  Istvan Majoros
Yamamoto defeated Istvan Majoros by KO (Knee to the liver) at 3:46 of the 1st round.

Fight #10, HERO'S MMA Rules:
  Hong-man Choi vs.  Bobby Ologun
Choi defeated Ologun by TKO (Punches) at 0:16 of the 1st round.

Fight #11, K-1 Rules:
  Masato vs.  Satoru Suzuki
Masato defeated Suzuki by TKO (Low Kicks) at 2:22 of the 2nd round.

Fight #12, HERO'S MMA Rules:
  Yoshihiro Akiyama vs.  Kazushi Sakuraba
This fight was ruled a No Contest on January 11, 2007 by FEG.

The original result of the fight was Akiyama defeated Sakuraba by TKO at 5:37 of the 1st round.

See also
 List of K-1 events
 List of male kickboxers
 PRIDE Shockwave 2006

References

External links
K-1 Official Website

K-1 events
Hero's events
2006 in kickboxing
2006 in mixed martial arts
Kickboxing in Japan
Mixed martial arts in Japan
Sport in Osaka